Edipo a Colono is a piece of incidental music. Gioachino Rossini composed it in 1817 for bass voice, men's chorus and orchestra.

Three excerpts were furnished with French lyrics and published in 1844: the choruses La Foi and l'Esperance, and the aria Ame innocent.

After a long absence, the 'Rossini renaissance' brought about a staged revival at the Rossini Opera Festival at Pesaro in 1982, and again in 1995, using the critical edition published by the Fondazione Rossini/Casa Ricordi edited by Lorenzo Tozzi and Piero Weiss.

References

External links
List of numbers at Musicbrainz

Compositions by Gioachino Rossini
Adaptations of works by Sophocles
Incidental music
1817 compositions